The Complex is the second full-length album by Blue Man Group, released in 2003. The album produced two singles, and debuted at #60 on the Billboard charts. As with the previous album, a DVD-Audio version was released, containing a high-definition (96 kHz/24-bit) 5.1 surround sound mix. The Allmusic review by Robert L. Doerschuk states "Although its inspirations, musical and conceptual, trace as far back as Kraftwerk, The Complex serves as a reminder that modern devices and glistening production values can be applied to the most primal creative instincts, if utilized by the right — blue — hands".

Track listing
"Above" (Dyas, Goldman, Heinemann, Pai, Perlmutter, Stanton, Wink) – 2:46
"Time to Start" (Dyas, Goldman, Stanton, Wink) – 3:43
"Sing Along" (Dyas, Goldman, Stanton, Wink) – 3:25
featuring Dave Matthews
"Up to the Roof" (Dyas, Gleitsman, Goldman, Heinemann, Perlmutter, Stanton, Wink) – 3:51
featuring Tracy Bonham
"Your Attention" (Dyas, Goldman, Heinemann, Pai, Perlmutter, Stanton, Wink) – 4:09
"Persona" (Dyas, Gleitsman, Goldman, Stanton, Wink) – 4:30
featuring Josh Haden
"Piano Smasher" (Dyas, Golden, Goldman, Perlmutter, Stanton, Wink) – 3:00
"White Rabbit" (Grace Slick) – 2:54
featuring Esthero
"The Current" (Dyas, Gleitsman, Goldman, Stanton, Wink) – 3:48
featuring Gavin Rossdale
"Shadows, Pt. 2" (Dyas, Gleitsman, Goldman, Perlmutter, Stanton, Wink) – 2:56
featuring Tracy Bonham and Rob Swift
"What Is Rock" (Dyas, Gleitsman, Goldman, Stanton, Wink) – 3:11
featuring Arone Dyer and Peter Moore
"The Complex" (Dyas, Gleitsman, Goldman, Heinemann, Stanton, Wink) – 6:25
featuring Peter Moore
"I Feel Love" (Bellotte, Moroder, Summer) – 5:13
featuring Annette Strean of Venus Hum
"Exhibit 13" (Banks, Dyas, Goldman, Heinemann, Parrulli, Stanton, Wink) – 8:51
Actual length is  – 4:01
Includes a hidden track - Mandelbrot No. 4, length:  – 4:19

Concept
The Complex is a concept album that takes place in two separate worlds: the world of the rock concert, as in the song "Time to Start," and the alienating world of the modern urban workplace, as in the songs "Sing Along," "The Current", and "The Complex." Both worlds are then tied together in the song "What Is Rock," which contrasts the celebratory "loss of identity" within a rock performance with the dehumanizing "loss of identity" within the workplace. These themes were illustrated during performance by animations that told the story of a faceless worker eventually escaping "up to the roof" and discovering their true self.

Personnel
Matt Goldman, Phil Stanton, Chris Wink (CMP) - founders
Chris Dyas - baritone guitar, e-bow, guitar, harpsichord, zither
Larry Heinemann - bass, chapman stick, guitar, pressaphonic, tubulum, zither
Todd Perlmutter - drums, narrator (2,5,11), percussion programming
Blue Man - airpoles, anvil, backpack tubulum, big drum, cimbalom, cuica, dogulum, drumulum, dulcimer, dumpster, mandeldrums, mellotron cello, paddle tubulum, percussion, piano smasher, PVC instrument, tubulum, 1981 casiotone and kazoo.
Tracy Bonham - vocals (4,10)
Arone Dyer - vocals (11)
Esthero - vocals (8)
Josh Haden - vocals (6)
Dave Matthews - vocals (3)
Peter Moore  - vocals (11,12), keyboards (15)
Gavin Rossdale - vocals (9)
Annette Strean and Venus Hum - vocals and effects (13)
Rob Swift - turntables (10)
Dave Anania - percussion (11)
Chris Bowen - tubulum (13), voiceover (11)
Nels Cline - guitar (6,8-10,13)
Dan the Automator - programming (3,9)
Jeffrey Doornbos - tubulum (13)
Byron Estep - dobro guitar (5)
Brooke Ferris - start voice (2), "words on the left" (5)
Avram Gleitsman - guitar (9)
Spalding Gray - "words on the right" (5)
Kid Koala - samples (11)
Elvis Lederer - zither (5,15)
Ian Pai - percussion (1,2,5,10,15)
Jeff Quay - percussion & double drum kit (5,6,12,15)
Brian Scott - tubulum (13)
Dave Steele - guitar (4,8,9,12), zither (4,12)
Rob Swift - turntable (5,10)
Chris Traynor - guitar (9)
Jeff Turlik - guitar (1,2,5,8,9,12-15), zither (14,15)
Todd Waetzig - percussion (11)
Jordan Cohen, Matthew Kriemelman, Jeff Tortora, Vince Verderame, Todd Waetzig, Nick White - Vegas Drum Army (1,2,5,6,7 & 13)
Dave Anania, Chris Bowen, Wes Day, Jeffrey Doornbos, Randall Jaynes, Josh Matthews, Ian Pai, Crag Rodriguez, Pete Simpson, Pete Starrett, Clem Waldman - NY Drum Army (2,5,15)

Production
Producers: Todd Perlmutter, Matt Goldman, Phil Stanton, Chris Wink
Executive producer: Jeff Skillen
Engineers: Bill Bookheim, Joe Hogan, Joe O'Connell, Todd Perlmutter, Andrew Schneider
Mixing: Rich Costey, Andrew Schneider
Mastering: Bob Ludwig
Production supervisor: Jeff Levison
Production coordination: Jaime Ramírez
Product development: Michael Quinn, Jeni Ardizzone West
Programming: Dan the Automator, Todd Perlmutter
Computer engineering: Larry Heinemann
Vocal producers: Kip Kubin, Tony Miracle, Venus Hum
Sampling: Kid Koala
Arrangers: Peter Moore, Ian Pai, Dave Steele, Jeff Turlik
Studio assistant: Mike Napolitano
Art consultant: Dan the Automator
Technician: Mike Napolitano
Drum technician: Carl Plaster
Art direction: Marcus Miller, Charles Tyler Ensemble
Design: Jen Graffam Wink
Artwork: David Bell
Cover image: Jen Graffam Wink

Charts

Album

Songs

References

External links

Blue Man Group albums
2003 albums
Concept albums